These are the list of federal constituencies (Bahagian Pilihan Raya Persekutuan) followed by the state constituencies (Bahagian Pilihan Raya Negeri) in Malaysia.

Each federal constituency contains 2 to 6 state constituencies, except in the federal territories where there are only federal constituencies. Constituency boundaries and administrative district boundaries may transcend each other and does not correspond with each other in most instances, but federal constituencies may not transcend across state borders. Federal constituencies are denoted by P.xxx, while state constituencies are denoted by N.xx.

Article 46 of the Malaysian Federal Constitution prescribes the composition of the House of Representatives. From Merdeka Day (1957) until 1963 only the total number of seats were specified. From 1963 until 1973 the seats were grouped into the States of Malaya (104 seats), Sabah (16 members), Sarawak (24 members) and Singapore (15 members until 1965). From 1973 onwards the number of seats per state and Federal Territory were prescribed and changed with subsequent constitutional amendments, the last being in 2006. There are in total 222 federal and 600 state electoral districts nationwide. Within each state the number of constituents in each district is not necessarily equal as Schedule 13, Part 2(c) of the Constitution requires a greater weightage to be given to rural districts. Until 1962 any variation was restricted to no more than fifteen percent from the average number of constituents per district across a state.

Electoral district boundaries are not permanent and the Election Commission may review and re-delineate boundaries at an interval of not less than 8 years. The last delineation exercise was made in 2018. On 17 July 2019, Dewan Rakyat approved Sabah state constituencies to increased from 60 to 73 seats thus they are used for snap election on 2020.

Summary

By area
Official source

By registered voters
Official source

Perlis

Kedah

Kelantan

Terengganu

Penang

Perak

Pahang

Selangor

Federal Territory of Kuala Lumpur

Federal Territory of Putrajaya

Negeri Sembilan

Malacca

Johor

Federal Territory of Labuan

Sabah

Sarawak

References

 
Eelectoral districts
M
Eelectoral districts